Army Group North (GAN) was a grouping of French field armies during the First World War, which was created on June 13, 1915 from  (GPN) which had been formed on October 4, 1914. On July 6, 1918, GAN was renamed Groupe d'armées du Centre (GAC).

Composition

October 1914 
 2nd Army (général Philippe Pétain)
 10th Army (général Louis de Maud'huy)
 Détachement d'Armée de Belgique (DAB) (général Victor d'Urbal)

July 1, 1915 
from North to South :
 Belgian Army (general Félix Wielemans)
 36th French Army Corps (général de division Alexis Hély d'Oissel)
 2nd British Army (General Horace Smith-Dorrien)
 1st British Army (General Douglas Haig)
 10th French Army (général Victor d'Urbal)
 2nd French Army (général Philippe Pétain)

July 1, 1916 
from North to South :
 6th Army (général Émile Fayolle)
 10th Army (général Victor d'Urbal)

February 15, 1917 
from North to South :
 3rd Army (général Georges Louis Humbert)
 1st Army (général Émile Fayolle)

Commanders 
 Général Ferdinand Foch (October 4, 1914 – December 27, 1916)
 Général Louis Franchet d'Espèrey (December 27, 1916 – June 10, 1918)
 Général Paul Maistre (June 10 – July 6, 1918)

Sources 
 The French Army and the First World War by Elizabeth Greenhalgh
 Cartographie 1914 - 1918
 Philippe Pétain et Marc Ferro (Avant-propos), La Guerre mondiale : 1914–1918, Toulouse, Éditions Privat, 2014, 372 p. (OCLC 891408727)
 Les Armées Françaises dans la Grande Guerre. Tome X. Premier volume, p. 13 et s. Ministère de la Guerre 1923–1924

Military units and formations of France in World War I
Military units and formations established in 1914
Army groups of France
Army groups of World War I